Mirov may refer to
 Mírov, a village and municipality in the Czech Republic
Mirow, a town in Germany
Mirov (surname)